Daniel Guedes da Silva ((); born 2 April 1994) is a Brazilian footballer who plays as a right back for Juventude.

Club career

Santos
Born in João Ramalho, São Paulo, Guedes joined Santos FC's youth setup in 2011, aged 17. On 19 February 2014 he renewed his link with Peixe until 2017.

On 30 November 2014, Guedes made his first team – and Série A – debut, starting in a 2–0 home win against Botafogo. He established himself as a starter under new manager Marcelo Fernandes in the following year, as the starting right-back Victor Ferraz was regularly used in the other flank.

On 22 September 2015, Guedes further extended his contract until February 2019. Mainly a backup option to Victor Ferraz, he scored his first professional goal on 12 July 2017, netting from a direct free kick in a 1–0 away win against Atlético Mineiro.

On 18 July 2017, Guedes renewed his contract until June 2022. He began the 2018 campaign as a starter under new manager Jair Ventura, but subsequently lost his starting spot to longtime incumbent Victor Ferraz.

Goiás (loan)
On 12 March 2019, after being demoted to third-choice after the return Matheus Ribeiro, Guedes was loaned to fellow top tier side Goiás until the end of the year. He initially split his starting spot with Yago Rocha, but was preventively suspended in September after being caught in a doping exam.

Guedes was sentenced an eight-month ban on 16 July 2020, but since he already had spent ten months without playing, his sentence was already served.

Cruzeiro (loan)
On 8 August 2020, Guedes was loaned to Série B side Cruzeiro until December 2021. He left the club in November, after just seven matches, and attempted to return to Goiás on loan until the end of the campaign; he only stayed at the club for two weeks, as the loan was subsequently declared void after Goiás failed to reach an agreement with Santos.

Back to the Raposa, Guedes was separated from the first team squad by new manager Luiz Felipe Scolari.

Fortaleza (loan)
On 4 March 2021, Guedes joined top tier side Fortaleza on loan for the 2021 campaign.

2022 season
Upon returning, Guedes was not registered by Peixe for the 2022 Campeonato Paulista, and terminated his contract with the club on 24 March 2022.

Cuiabá
On 9 April 2022, Guedes signed for Cuiabá also in the top tier.

Career statistics

Honours
Santos
Copa São Paulo de Futebol Júnior: 2013, 2014
Copa do Brasil Sub-20: 2013
Campeonato Paulista: 2016

Fortaleza
Campeonato Cearense: 2021

References

External links
Santos FC profile 

1994 births
Living people
Footballers from São Paulo (state)
Brazilian footballers
Association football defenders
Campeonato Brasileiro Série A players
Campeonato Brasileiro Série B players
Santos FC players
Goiás Esporte Clube players
Cruzeiro Esporte Clube players
Fortaleza Esporte Clube players
Cuiabá Esporte Clube players
Esporte Clube Juventude players
Doping cases in association football
Brazilian sportspeople in doping cases